Bewal (Punjabi and ) is a town and Union Council in Pakistan's Punjab province. It is situated in the eastern part of Gujar Khan Tehsil, in Rawalpindi District.

References 

Union councils of Gujar Khan Tehsil